Anatropanthus is a species of plants in the family Apocynaceae first described as a genus in 1908. It contains only one known species, Anatropanthus borneensis , endemic to the Island of Borneo. This species has been subsumed into genus Hoya as of 2020 under the name Hoya insularis.

References

Endemic flora of Borneo
Asclepiadoideae
Monotypic Apocynaceae genera